Aaminah Haq, also variously spelled as Aamina Haq and Amna Haq) is a Pakistani model and actress. Haq has modelled for magazines including She, Libas, Visage, Women's Own, Fashion Collection and Newsline. She also hosted three seasons of Lux Style ki Duniya, and hosted a chat show for Aag TV, called the Aaminah Haq Show. Haq has acted in a number of Urdu TV dramas such as Chaandni Raatain and Ghulam Gardish. She also appeared in the TV drama Mehndi: The Color of Emotions.

Personal life
Aaminah Haq is a cousin of Hina Rabbani Khar, former Foreign Minister of Pakistan. Haq and fashion designer Ammar Belal were married in 2009. she is daughter of former chief minister punjab Ghulam Mustafa Khar

Television serials

 Aina
 Chupke Chupke
 Doorian
 Aap Jaisa Koi
 Haal e Dil

Music videos
Fraudiye, by Awaz
Ankhoon Ko Ankhoon Ne, by Junaid Jamshed
Channa Ve Channa, by Rahim Shah
Mahive, by Faakhir
Dekha, by Ali Zafar
Chhoo Ke Dekho
Bohut Garam
Chal Bullehia, by Mekaal Hasan Band

Accolades

See also
 List of Pakistani actresses

References

External links
 

Pakistani television actresses
Pakistani female models
Actresses from Lahore
Living people
21st-century Pakistani actresses
Khar family
Year of birth missing (living people)
People from Lahore